Christopher Nugent Lawrence Brooke  (23 June 1927 – 27 December 2015) was a British medieval historian. From 1974 to 1994 he was Dixie Professor of Ecclesiastical History at the University of Cambridge.

Early life and education
Born on 23 June 1927, Brooke was the son of Zachary Nugent Brooke (1883–1946) and his wife Rosa Grace Brooke (1888–1964). Following schooling at Winchester College, Brooke undertook his undergraduate work at Gonville and Caius College, Cambridge, where he studied with David Knowles.

Academic career
Brooke spent his early years as head of department at Westfield College, University of London, before taking up a post at Caius from 1977 to 1994, where he remained a life fellow. He held the position of Dixie Professor of Ecclesiastical History at Cambridge and before becoming a professor emeritus. He was President of the Ecclesiastical History Society (1968–1969).

Later life
Brooke died on 27 December 2015 at the age of 88.

Personal life
It was at Cambridge that Brooke met his future wife, fellow medievalist Rosalind Brooke (née Clark) in 1951. She died in 2014. Christopher N. L. Brooke died on 27 December 2015.

Selected works
Among Brooke's publications are:

 The Church and the Welsh Border in the Central Middle Ages
 London, 800–1216: The Shaping of a City
 The English Church & the Papacy, From the Conquest to the Reign of John
 The Medieval Idea of Marriage
 A History of the University of Cambridge. Vol. 4, 1870–1990
 Churches and Churchmen in Medieval Europe
 The Normans as Cathedral Builders
 The Architectural History of Winchester Cathedral
 The Saxon and Norman Kings
 From Alfred to Henry III 871–1272
 Carte Nativorum: A Peterborough Abbey Cartulary of the Fourteenth Century
 The Letters of John of Salisbury
 The Letters of John of Salisbury. Vol. 2, The Later Letters (1163–1180)
 A History of Gonville and Caius College
 Gilbert Foliot and His Letters
 The Heads of Religious Houses, England and Wales: Volume 1, 940–1216
 The Investiture Disputes
 Religious Sentiment and Church Design in the Later Middle Ages
 Archbishop Lanfranc, the English Bishops and the Council of London of 1075
 The Monastic Constitutions of Lanfranc
 Councils and Synods, with Other Documents Relating to the English Church: Volume I: A.D. 871–1204
 Hugh the Chanter: The History of the Church of York, 1066–1127
Oxford and Cambridge. Cambridge University Press, 1988 (with Roger Highfield)

References

External links
 

British medievalists
Alumni of Gonville and Caius College, Cambridge
Anglo-Saxon studies scholars
Commanders of the Order of the British Empire
Fellows of Gonville and Caius College, Cambridge
Fellows of the Society of Antiquaries of London
Fellows of the British Academy
People educated at Winchester College
Presidents of the Ecclesiastical History Society
1927 births
2015 deaths
Corresponding Fellows of the Medieval Academy of America
Fellows of the Royal Historical Society
Presidents of the Society of Antiquaries of London
Record Society of Lancashire and Cheshire
Dixie Professors of Ecclesiastical History